Aditya Joshi (born 7 August 1996) is an Indian badminton player. He is the first male Indian junior badminton player who ranked first place in the world junior rankings.

Career
Joshi comes from Uttarakhand, India. Joshi got the number one slot in the junior rankings of the World Badminton Federation in January 2014. He was at the 11th position till November 2013, but he managed to jump ahead of all the players by achieving 18,776 points and got top ranked in the world. Joshi was the junior national champion in year 2013 and had won two gold medals in Indian junior international tournament. In 2012 he participated at the India Open Grand Prix Gold.

Aditya started playing badminton in 2001 when he was only five and very soon, he started winning in the categories above his age in the local tournaments. He clinched the gold in Remensco Junior International tournament held in Russia in 2011. During the same year, he won a gold medal in Asian Sub-Junior championship held in Japan.

Achievements

BWF International 

  BWF International Challenge tournament
  BWF International Series tournament
  BWF Future Series tournament

BWF Junior International 
 

  BWF Junior International Grand Prix tournament
  BWF Junior International Challenge tournament
  BWF Junior International Series tournament
  BWF Junior Future Series tournament

References

External links 
 

Living people
1996 births
Indian male badminton players
Racket sportspeople from Madhya Pradesh
Badminton players at the 2014 Summer Youth Olympics